Swadesh Bharati (born 12 December 1939) is a Hindi poet, recipient of "Premchand Award" and "Sahitya Bhushan Award". He lives in Kolkata from where he edits Rupambara, a literary bilingual quarterly journal. He has been in active field of creative writing since more than 45 years. He is chairman of Rashtriya Hindi Academy and was guest lecturer at Madaras Christian Academy.

A short preview of his life 
Born at Pratapgarh (U.P) on 12 December 1939 and educated at Ewing Christian College, Allahabad, Charuchandra College, of the University of Calcutta, Annamalai University, Chennai with MA in Public Administration.  He received the highest literary Honours as Sahitya Mahamhopadhyay (D.Lit), from Hindi Sahitya Sammelan, Prayag. He started writing at the age of 12 years.

Sri Bharati's Poems are included in "Chautha Saptak" (The Four Raga), a historic Hindi Poetry Collection edited by "Ajneya", internationally acclaimed poet and Author.

His poems reveal the inner depth of mystic nature's enchanting beauty, the struggle and existence of mankind.  The critics describe his Poetry as multi-dimensional, the expression of nature, and the modern life's decadence with new awareness and an expression of stream of new consciousness, freedom, peace, love and happiness for making a new generation of world. He has widely travelled in India and abroad, that is why his expressions have multi-dimensional shades and experiences.

He has to his credit 22 collections of poems, eight novels and 45 edited works, published 200 volumes of Rupambara- literary journal by remaining its editor for 40 years. He travelled in USA, Britain, France and other countries to participate in Poetry Symposia, and meetings of board of directors of International Children’s Community Foundation.

Swadesh Bharati, has contributed many of his poems and short stories to Indian Languages especially to Bengali literature. Desh, Anandabazar Patrika, Kalikalam, Krittibas, Anuvad Patrika and other literary Journals published his work. He was a member of Krittibas Gosthi with Belal Chowdhury, Malay Roy Choudhury, Shakti Chattopadhyay, Subhas Mukhopadhyay, Sunil Gangopadhyay.

During the 1970s and 1980s, he edited the works of Jibanananda Das, the great Bengali poet −1970. He also edited Modern Indian Poetry in Telugu, Tamil and Marathi. He has translated Bengali Poetry and published Modern Indian Poetry – Bengali among whom include Kaviguru Rabindranath Tagore (The Last Poems), Shakti Chattopadhyay (Aboni Badi Achho), Subhas Mukhopadhyay (Ulang Raja).

Awards
He received Premchand Award from U.P. Govt in 1989 on his Novel 'Auratnama' (The women hood).
He was conferred Sahitya Mahopadhyay (Doctor of Literature) by Hindi Sahitya Sammelan, (Hindi University), Allahabad in 1993.
He received Hindi Seva Samman (Award for continuous writing), by Mysore Hindi Parishad at Vigyan Bhavan, New Delhi on 29 October 1994.
He was honoured with Sahitya Bhushan Award by U.P. Hindi Sansthan, Govt. of Uttar Pradesh, on 27 December 2001; he was honoured for remarkable achievements in Hindi literature & services to Hindi & other Indian Languages by National Institute of Teachers Technical Training & Research, Bhopal.
The Government of India nominated him as a member of Kendriya Hindi Samiti, constituted under the chairmanship of Hon. Prime Minister, India.
He was also facilitated by Kumbh at Bangalore by Mysore Hindi Prachar Parishad as a great Indian Author on 5 February 2005, by Governor of Karnataka, Minister of Labour, Govt. of India.
He has been also nominated as member of the Ministry of Textile & Ministry of Power Hindi Salahkar Samiti Govt. of India.

Published works 
Ikees Subhah Aur, – 21 Mornings more, Poetry Collection, Tr. & Pub. In Oriya, 1969
International Poetry Number; Vo., 1, Poetry Collection containing selected poetry of 16 major world languages, 1969
Indian Poetry Today, Rupambara Prakashan (Calcutta) Marathi (Poetry Collection), 1969
Indian Poetry Today, Telugu (Poetry Collection), 1970
Shav-Yatra (The Funeral Procession), Novel, 1970
Satven Dashak Ki Shreshtha Kahaniya (The Best Strories of 7th Decade in Hindi), Best selected Short Stories, 1970
Mahanagar (The Metropolis), Selected Short Stories, 1970
Indian Poetry Today, Bengali (Selected Bengali Poetry Collection), 1971
Indian Poetry Today, Oriya (Selected Oriya Poetry Collection), 1974
Awajon Ke Kathghare Mein (Amidst the stockade of sounds), (Poetry Collection), 1976
Tapis Mitati Nahin (Thirst Never quenches), (Poetry Collection), 1976
Poems included in Chautha Saptak (The fourth Raga) (Edited by Ajneya, the famous poet), (Poetry Collection), 1981
Man Chahta hai Apanapan, (Poetry Collection), 1981
Sampratik Hindi Sahitya-Rachana Aur Alochana (Creation & Criticism in contemporary Hindi Literature), (Literary Criticism), 1981
Hindi Ki Sarvashreshtha Kavitayen – The best Poems in Hindi (Edited by Bachchan, the famous Poet, father of super film star Amitabh Bachchan), (Poetry Collection), 1981
Doosra Vamachar – The second thinker, (Long Verse), 1983
Kathanagar – The story-city, (Short stories), 1984
Auratnama -The Womanhood (Premchand Award winning book) (Tr. in Oriya), (Novel), 1984
Saharyar (The city friend) (Tr. in English), (Novel), 1985
Bhare Hat Ke Beech – Amidst the crowded market (Poetry Collection), (Tr. & Pub. in Oriya), 1987
Samkaleen Hindi Kavitayen, (Contemporary Hindi Poetry Collection), 1984
Samakaleen Oriya Kaveitayen (Oriya Poetry Collection in Hindi) 1984, (Oriya Poetry Collection in Hindi), 1984
Jeebananda Das Ki Kavitayen, (The best Poems of Jeebananand Das in Hindi, Tr. from Bengali), 1984
Calcutta O' Calcutta (1st Vol.), (Long Poem on Calcutta), 1990
Yatna Shivir – (Based on Bangladesh Liberation Struggle) (Tr. in Bengali), The Concentration Camp (Novel) 1990
Trasadi Ke Dwar par, (At the Door Step of Decadence), (Poetry Collection), 1991
Sidhian Chandta Surya (Stepping up sun), (Poetry Collection), 1994
Ghatana-Durghatna -(The Incident-Accidents) Novel, 1994
Surya Ka Ahat Manun (The Wounded Silence of the Sun), Poetry Collection, 1999
Anantah (The unending), Poetry Collection, 2001 
Samay Ki Jarjar Nav Mein (In the broken boat at time), Poetry Collection, 2001
Nagar Bandhu (The City Friend), (Novel)  , 2001
Sagar Priya (The ocean beloved), (An Epic), 2005
Hindi Ki Vikash Yatra  (Progress-Journey of Hindi), 2005
Shabdateet  (Beyond words), Poetry Collection, 2005
Kolkata O' Kolkata (Vol I & II) Long Verse, 2005
Shikshan O' Prashikshan (4 Volumes), Related to Official Language implementation and Hindi Workshop Help Literature

References

Living people
1939 births
Indian male poets
Poets from Uttar Pradesh
Hindi-language writers
Charuchandra College alumni
University of Calcutta alumni
Annamalai University alumni
20th-century Indian poets
20th-century Indian male writers
Writers from Kolkata